Armin Imamović (born 17 February 2000) is a Bosnian professional footballer who plays as a left midfielder for Bosnian Premier League club Sarajevo.

Honours
Sarajevo
Bosnian Premier League: 2019–20

References

External links

2000 births
Living people
Sportspeople from Tuzla
Bosnia and Herzegovina footballers
Bosnia and Herzegovina youth international footballers
Association football midfielders
Premier League of Bosnia and Herzegovina players
FK Sarajevo players
FK Olimpik players